is a Japanese operator of eikaiwa (English conversation schools).

Peppy Kids Club
Peppy Kids Club, run by iTTTi Japan for children from 2.5 years old to high-school aged. , Peppy Kids Club has over 1150 locations all around Japan, with 95,000 students.  As of February 2011 it had 1627 Japanese and 421 foreign staff.

Branches outside Japan
The company iTTTi also has operations outside Japan: iTTTi Vancouver, iTTTi Toronto, iTTTi Brisbane, and iTTTi Los Angeles.

References

External links 
  
  

English conversation schools in Japan